Elbey Mirza-Hasan oglu Rzaguliyev (17 June 1926 – 15 September 2007) was an Azerbaijani Soviet artist and stage director, and father of artist Ayten Rzaguliyeva.

Titles
In 1964, Elbey Rzaguliyev was awarded the title of Honored Art Worker. In 1977, he was conferred a title of People's Artist of Azerbaijan and was a secretary at the Union of Artists of Azerbaijan. In 1998, he was awarded Shohrat Order of Azerbaijan for his merits in visual arts.

Education
 Technical School of Arts named after Azim Azimzade, Baku
 Gerasimov Institute of Cinematography, Moscow

Filmography
 1991 – Gazalkhan
 1987 – Ringleader
 1982 – Here you'll not be met by paradise
 1979 – Interrupted serenade
 1977 – Punch in the back
 1974 – Winds blow in Baku
 1974 – Along dangerous marine way (short film)
 1973 – Arrival of the violin
 1973 – It's dangerous to go to the sea (short film)
 1971 – A day has passed
 1970 – Sevil
 1986 – The last night of childhood
 1966 – Arshin mal alan
 1963 – There is such an island, too
 1962 – Telephonist girl
 1957 – Two from the same quarter
 1955 – Meeting
 1955 – Lovely song

References 

1926 births
Artists from Baku
2007 deaths
Gerasimov Institute of Cinematography alumni
Recipients of the Shohrat Order
20th-century Azerbaijani painters
Honored Art Workers of the Azerbaijan SSR